Fritz E. Borgnis (December 24, 1906 – August 27, 1982) was a German applied physicist and electrical engineer, known for his contributions to microwave physics,  guided waves and ultrasonic measurements for medical diagnostics.

Background 
Fritz E. Borgnis was born on December 24, 1906, in Mannheim, Germany. 
After completing high school in Hamburg, he matriculated at the Technische Hochschule of Munich where he received a diploma in electrical engineering in 1929. He continued at the University of Munich and obtained a Dr. Ing. degree in the field of current flow by convection and diffusion. He continued his academic career at the University of Graz followed by two years at the ETH Zurich from 1948 until 1950. During the next seven years, he worked and taught at various universities in the USA. From 1957 until 1960 he acted as director of research at the Allgemeine Deutsche Philips Industrie in Hamburg. 1960 Borgnis accepted a faculty position at the ETH in Zurich. He became full professor for high-frequency electronics.

From the early 1960s, projects at his institute at the ETH dealt with measurements of flow in liquids using ultrasound. Several publications describe the progress achieved as pioneers in this field. Initial experiments were performed in blood vessels of dogs. Later, experiments to measure the flow in human blood vessels were conducted.

He retired in 1977 after working and teaching at the ETH during 17 years.

Books 
Electromagnetic Waveguides and Resonators, in Handbuch der Physik, vol. XVI, (Springer-Verlag, 1958).  With Charles H. Papas
Randwertprobleme der Mikrowellenphysik (Springer-Verlag, 1955).  With Charles H. Papas

Awards 
 Fellow of the American Physical Society 
 Fellow of the Institute of Electrical and Electronics Engineers
 Fellow of the Acoustical Society of America

References 

1906 births
1982 deaths
20th-century German engineers
Academic staff of ETH Zurich
Fellow Members of the IEEE
Fellows of the American Physical Society